Xi'an Reservoir, also known as Hsi-an Reservoir,  is a reservoir on the Penghu Islands, located in Wang'an Township, Penghu County, Taiwan.

The construction of Xi'an Reservoir started in July 1985, and was completed in October 1987. It has a total storage capacity of 240,000 cubic meters and a catchment area of 0.82 square kilometers.

References

Reservoirs in Taiwan
Geography of Penghu County
Buildings and structures in Taiwan
Buildings and structures completed in 1987